Ocybadistes ardea, the dark orange dart, is a butterfly of the family Hesperiidae. It is found in Indonesia (Papua, the Aru Islands, the Kei Islands), Australia (Queensland) and Papua New Guinea.

The wingspan is about 20 mm.

Subspecies
Ocybadistes ardea ardea
Ocybadistes ardea heterobathra

External links
Australian Faunal Directory
Australian Insects

Taractrocerini
Butterflies described in 1906